"Pile ou face" ("heads or tails") is a song by French model, actress and singer Corynne Charby. She released it in 1987 as a single and on the album Toi.

The song debuted at number 47 in France during the week of 30 May 1987, climbing all the way to number five for one week in July.

Composition 
The song was written and produced by Franck Yvy and Jean-Louis D'Onorio.

Track listing 
7" single (Polydor 885 730-7)
 "Pile ou face" (3:58)
 "Elle part (dans ses rêves)" (3:55)

Covers 
Emmanuelle Béart sang this song in François Ozon's 2002 movie 8 Women.

Charts

References 

Corynne Charby songs
1987 songs
1987 singles
Polydor Records singles